Eduard Sergeyevich Korchagin (born 16 January 1979), known as Edik Korchagin, is a Russian former footballer. He played as a forward.

References

External links
 FC Lokomotiv Moscow profile 

Living people
1979 births
People from Mozdoksky District
Association football forwards
Russian footballers
Russia under-21 international footballers
AS Saint-Étienne players
MVV Maastricht players
Akademisk Boldklub players
PSV Eindhoven players
FC Dynamo Moscow players
FC Shinnik Yaroslavl players
PFC Spartak Nalchik players
FC Lokomotiv Moscow players
FC Torpedo Moscow players
Eredivisie players
Russian Premier League players
Russian expatriate footballers
Expatriate footballers in France
Expatriate footballers in the Netherlands
Expatriate men's footballers in Denmark
FC Olimp-Dolgoprudny players
Sportspeople from North Ossetia–Alania